The molecular formula C10H8O4 (molar mass: 192.17 g/mol, exact mass: 192.0423 u) may refer to:

 Anemonin
 Furoin
 Scopoletin, a coumarin
 the monomer of polyethylene terephthalate